Frank Samuel Herbert Kendon (12 September 1893 – 28 December 1959) was an English writer, poet and academic. He was also an illustrator, and journalist.

Life
He was the son of Samuel Kendon, a schoolmaster at Bethany School, Goudhurst; the educator Olive Kendon was his sister. He matriculated in 1921 at St John's College, Cambridge, where he became a Fellow in 1948.

Kendon was a published poet in the 1920s and later a writer of stories and a novel. From 1935 to 1954 he worked for Cambridge University Press. At the beginning of World War II he was a campaigning pacifist.  After the war, he undertook the translations of the Psalms in the New English Bible, but died before he could complete the work. Timothy d'Arch Smith argued tentatively for Kendon's inclusion in the canon of Uranian poets in view of a poem, in Poems and Sonnets, singing the praises of naked bathing boys – a Uranian staple.

Works

Poems by Four Authors (1923) with J. R. Ackerley, A. Y. Campbell, and Edward Davison
Poems and Sonnets (London, 1924)
Mural paintings in English churches during the Middle Ages: an introductory essay on the folk influence in religious art (Bodley Head 1923)
Arguments & Emblems (1925)
A Life and Death of Judas Iscariot (Bodley Head 1926))
The Small Years (1930) autobiography
The Adventure of Poetry (1932)
Tristram (1934) poem
The Cherry Minder (1935) poems
The Flawless Stone (1942) poem
The Time Piece (1945) poem
Each Silver Fly
The Farmers Friend
Cage & Wing (1947) poem
Martin Makesure (1950) novel
Jacob & Thomas: Darkness (1950)
Thirty Six Psalms, an English Version, Cambridge University Press, 1963

Family
Kendon had four children with his wife, Elizabeth Cecilia Phyllis Horne, a school teacher. The children were Alice, Adam Kendon, Andrew and Thomas (known as Adrian).

Notes

1893 births
1959 deaths
Alumni of St John's College, Cambridge
English male poets
20th-century English poets
20th-century English male writers